Thananchai Rachanon is a Thai Muay Thai fighter.

Personal life
Thananchai was taught Muay Thai from a young age by his father. He made his professional debut at 14.
In 2020, Thananchai moved from Rachanon gym to Sitsongpeenpong to chase his dream of becoming a World Champion.

Titles and accomplishments
World Muay Thai Council
 2018 WMC World -147 lb Champion
Professional Boxing Association of Thailand (PAT) 
 2018 Thailand -147 lb Champion
Phoenix Fighting Championship
 2018 Phoenix FC -147 lb Champion
Siam Omnoi Stadium
 2018 Omnoi Stadium -147 lb Champion
International Federation of Muaythai Associations
 2019 IFMA World Championships -67 kg 
 2021 IFMA World Championships -71 kg 
World Games
 2022 IFMA Muay Thai at the World Games -71 kg 
World Boxing Council Muay Thai
 2023 WBC Muay Thai World Super Welterweight (154 lbs) Champion

Fight record

|-  style="background:#cfc;"
| 2023-03-11 || Win ||align=left| Nauzet Trujillo || KSP Muay Thai|| Kuwait City || KO || 4|| 
|-
! style=background:white colspan=9 |
|-  style="background:#cfc;"
| 2023-02-04 ||Win ||align=left| Oussama Elkouche || Amazing Muay Thai Festival || Hua Hin, Thailand|| Decision (Unanimous) || 3 || 3:00
|-  style="background:#cfc"
| 2022-10-28 || Win ||align=left| Mohammad Venum Muaythai || Rajadamnern World Series|| Bangkok, Thailand||  KO (Knee to the body)|| 2 || 1:35
|-  style="background:#cfc"
| 2022-09-23 || Win ||align=left| Thoeun Theara || Rajadamnern World Series|| Bangkok, Thailand|| Decision (Unanimous) || 3 || 3:00
|-  style="text-align:center; background:#cfc;"
| 2022-08-19 || Win ||align=left| Mohammad Venum Muaythai || Rajadamnern World Series || Bangkok, Thailand || Decision (Unanimous) || 3 || 3:00
|-  style="background:#cfc"
| 2022-05-14 || Win||align=left| Valentin Thibaut || Venum Fight, Rajadamnern Stadium || Bangkok, Thailand||  Decision|| 5 ||3:00 
|-
|-  style="background:#cfc;"
| 2022-03-12||Win||align=left| Tucker Sorrell || Muay Thai Super Champ|| Phuket, Thailand || Decision ||3 || 3:00
|-  style="background:#cfc;"
| 2022-01-23||Win||align=left| Maxim Branis || Muay Thai Super Champ|| Phuket, Thailand || Decision ||3 || 3:00
|-  style="background:#fbb;"
| 2021-04-02|| Loss||align=left| Phetmorakot Petchyindee Academy || True4U Muaymanwansuk, Rangsit Stadium || Rangsit, Thailand ||Decision ||5 ||3:00
|-  style="background:#cfc;"
| 2020-11-13||Win||align=left| Sorgraw Petchyindee || True4U Muaymanwansuk, Rangsit Stadium || Pathum Thani, Thailand || Decision ||5 || 3:00
|- style="background:#fbb;"
| 2020-08-28 || Loss ||align=left| Chujaroen Dabransarakarm || True4U Muaymanwansuk, Rangsit Stadium || Pathum Thani, Thailand || Decision || 5 || 3:00
|-  style="background:#cfc;"
| 2020-02-28||Win||align=left| Sangmanee Sor Tienpo || Ruamponkonchon Pratan Super Fight || Pathum Thani, Thailand || Decision ||5 || 3:00
|-  style="background:#fbb;"
| 2020-01-24||Loss||align=left| Yodpanomrung Jitmuangnon || Lumpinee Stadium || Bangkok, Thailand ||Decision  || 5 || 3:00
|-
! style=background:white colspan=9 |
|-  style="background:#cfc;"
| 2019-10-15||Win||align=left| Yodpanomrung Jitmuangnon || Lumpinee Stadium || Bangkok, Thailand ||TKO (Doctor Stop/Elbow)|| 4 ||
|-  style="background:#cfc;"
| 2019-09-09||Win||align=left| Luo Jie || WBC Muaythai Lumpinee Stadium || Bangkok, Thailand ||TKO || 1 ||
|- style="background:#cfc;"
| 2019-03-08|| Win || align="left" | Jack Kennedy || Fight Night Dubai || United Arab Emirates || Decision (Unanimous)  || 3 || 3:00
|- style="background:#fbb;"
| 2018-11-27 || Loss ||align=left| Chujaroen Dabransarakarm || Lumpinee Stadium || Bangkok, Thailand || Decision || 5 || 3:00
|-  style="background:#fbb;"
| 2018-10-12 || Loss ||align=left| Rafi Bohic || All Star Muay-Thai || Aubervilliers, France || KO (Low Kick) || 3 || 
|-
! style=background:white colspan=9 |
|- style="background:#cfc;"
| 2018-08-25 || Win||align=left| Phonek Or.Kwanmuang|| Omnoi Stadium || Bangkok, Thailand || Decision || 5 || 3:00
|-
! style=background:white colspan=9 |
|- style="background:#cfc;"
| 2018-07-10 || Win ||align=left| Chujaroen Dabransarakarm || Lumpinee Stadium || Bangkok, Thailand || Decision || 5 || 3:00
|- style="background:#cfc;"
| 2018-05-18 || Win||align=left| Rambo Phet Por.Tor.Aor||  Lumpinee Stadium || Bangkok, Thailand || Decision || 5 || 3:00
|-
! style=background:white colspan=9 |
|- style="background:#cfc;"
| 2018-03 || Win||align=left| Rambo Phet Por.Tor.Aor||   || Phra Nakhon Si Ayutthaya, Thailand || Decision || 5 || 3:00
|-
! style=background:white colspan=9 |
|- style="background:#cfc;"
| 2018-02-07 || Win||align=left| Brayan Matias||  Muaythai Day || Bangkok, Thailand || Decision || 5 || 3:00
|-
! style=background:white colspan=9 |
|-  style="background:#fbb;"
| 2018-01||Loss||align=left| Yodpanomrung Jitmuangnon ||  || Yala Province, Thailand ||Decision  || 5 || 3:00
|- style="background:#cfc;"
| 2017-12-03 || Win||align=left| Navee J-Powerroof Puket || Rangsit Stadium  || Pathum Thani, Thailand || KO (Knees) || 3 ||
|- style="background:#cfc;"
| 2017-09-07 || Win||align=left| Joshua Suramach || Thai Fight Samui  || Koh Samui, Thailand || KO (Knees) || 2 ||
|- style="background:#cfc;"
| 2017-07-15 || Win||align=left| Ryan Jakiri || Thai Fight Yala  || Thailand || KO (Knee) || 2 ||
|- style="background:#cfc;"
| 2017-05-07 || Win||align=left| Simanut Sor.Sarinya  || Rangsit Stadium  || Pathum Thani, Thailand || KO (Knees) || 4 ||
|- style="background:#cfc;"
| 2017-04-09 || Win||align=left| Vinailek Sor.Jor.Vichitpadriew || Rangsit Stadium  || Pathum Thani, Thailand || TKO (Doctor Stop/Elbow) || 1 ||
|- style="background:#cfc;"
| 2017-03-10 || Win||align=left| Monsiam Lukmuangphet || Lumpinee Stadium || Bangkok, Thailand || KO || 4 ||
|- style="background:#fbb;"
| 2017-01-29 || Loss||align=left| Simanut Sor.Sarinya  || Rangsit Stadium  || Pathum Thani, Thailand || Decision || 5 || 3:00
|- style="background:#cfc;"
| 2017-01-08 || Win ||align=left| Phetsaifah Sor.Jor.Vichitpadriew  || Rangsit Stadium  || Pathum Thani, Thailand || Decision || 5 || 3:00
|- style="background:#cfc;"
| 2016-12-11 || Win ||align=left| Taksila Chor.Hapayak  || Rangsit Stadium  || Pathum Thani, Thailand || KO || 4 ||
|- style="background:#cfc;"
| 2016-09-18 || Win ||align=left| Fahnimit Wiriyafarm  || Rangsit Stadium  || Pathum Thani, Thailand || Decision || 5 || 3:00
|- style="background:#cfc;"
| 2016-08-26 || Win ||align=left| Mongkol Kor.Kampanath  || Lumpinee Stadium || Bangkok, Thailand || Decision || 5 || 3:00
|- style="background:#fbb;"
| 2016-05-17 ||Loss ||align=left| Mongkonngoen Aesapansung  || Lumpinee Stadium || Bangkok, Thailand || KO || 3 ||
|- style="background:#cfc;"
| 2016-04-05 ||Win||align=left| Hapayak Sitpupantoo || Lumpinee Stadium || Bangkok, Thailand ||Decision || 5 || 3:00
|- style="background:#cfc;"
| 2016-03-14 ||Win||align=left| Lotus Tor.Tewin || Rajadamnern Stadium || Bangkok, Thailand ||Decision || 5 || 3:00
|- style="background:#cfc;"
| 2016-02-13 ||Win||align=left| Fahmeta Tambangsai  || Lumpinee Stadium || Bangkok, Thailand ||Decision || 5 || 3:00
|- style="background:#fbb;"
| 2016-01-09 ||Loss||align=left| Fahmeta Tambangsai  || Lumpinee Stadium || Bangkok, Thailand ||Decision || 5 || 3:00
|- style="background:#cfc;"
| 2015-11-24 ||Win||align=left| Sakmongkol Sor.Sommai  || Lumpinee Stadium || Bangkok, Thailand || KO|| 3 ||
|- style="background:#fbb;"
| 2015-06-06 ||Loss||align=left| Bigball Changchana  || Siam Omnoi Boxing Stadium || Samut Sakhon, Thailand ||Decision || 5 || 3:00
|- style="background:#cfc;"
| 2015-05-15 ||Win||align=left| Petchtaksin Banklongprapimon|| Lumpinee Stadium || Bangkok, Thailand ||Decision || 5 || 3:00
|- style="background:#cfc;"
| 2015-03-24 ||Win||align=left| Kongkrai Sitboonmee || Lumpinee Stadium || Bangkok, Thailand ||Decision || 5 || 3:00
|- style="background:#cfc;"
| 2015-02-10 ||Win||align=left| Noomsurin Chor.Ketveena || Lumpinee Stadium || Bangkok, Thailand ||Decision || 5 || 3:00
|- style="background:#fbb;"
| 2015-01-16 ||Loss||align=left| Noomsurin Chor.Ketveena || Lumpinee Stadium || Bangkok, Thailand ||Decision || 5 || 3:00
|-
| colspan=9 | Legend:    

|-  style="background:#cfc;"
| 2022-07-17|| Win||align=left| Oleksandr Yefimenko ||IFMA at the 2022 World Games, Final|| Birmingham, Alabama, United States || Decision (30:27) || 3 ||3:00 
|-
! style=background:white colspan=9 |

|-  style="background:#cfc;"
| 2022-07-16|| Win ||align=left| Abdelali Zahidi ||IFMA at the 2022 World Games, Semi Finals|| Birmingham, Alabama, United States || Walk Over ||  ||

|-  style="background:#cfc;"
| 2022-07-15||Win||align=left| Itay Gershon ||IFMA at the 2022 World Games, Quarter Finals|| Birmingham, Alabama, United States || Decision (30:29) || 3 ||3:00

|-  style="background:#fbb;"
| 2021-12-10 || Loss||align=left| Jimmy Vienot || 2021 IFMA World Championships, Semi Finals || Bangkok, Thailand || Decision (30:27)|| 3 ||
|-
! style=background:white colspan=9 |
|-  style="background:#cfc;"
| 2021-12-09 || Win ||align=left| Mateusz Różak || 2021 IFMA World Championships, Quarter Finals || Bangkok, Thailand || TKO (Knee) ||  ||

|-  style="background:#cfc;"
| 2019-07-28 || Win ||align=left| Spéth Norbert Attila || 2019 IFMA World Championships, Final || Bangkok, Thailand || Decision || 3 || 3:00
|-
! style=background:white colspan=9 |

|-  style="background:#cfc;"
| 2019-07-27 || Win ||align=left| Erdem taha Dincer || 2019 IFMA World Championships, Semi Finals || Bangkok, Thailand || Decision  || 3 || 3:00

|-  style="background:#cfc;"
| 2019-07-26 || Win ||align=left| Itai Gayer || 2019 IFMA World Championships, Quarter Finals || Bangkok, Thailand || Decision  || 3 || 3:00

|-  style="background:#cfc;"
| 2019-07-24 || Win ||align=left| Freddy Gonzalez Castro || 2019 IFMA World Championships, Round 2 || Bangkok, Thailand || TKO || 2 ||

|-  style="background:#cfc;"
| 2019-07-22 || Win ||align=left| Saso Vorkapic || 2019 IFMA World Championships, Round 1 || Bangkok, Thailand || Decision || 3 || 3:00 
|-
| colspan=9 | Legend:

References

2001 births
Thananchai Rachanon
Living people
Thananchai Rachanon
Thananchai Rachanon